The 1961 Pittsburg State Gorillas football team was an American football team that represented Pittsburg State University during the 1961 NAIA football season. In their 13th season under head coach Carnie Smith, the team compiled an 11–0 record and shut out seven of eleven opponents. The team won the NAIA football national championship, the AP and UPI small college national championship, and the Central Intercollegiate Conference (CIC) championship.

Schedule

References

Pittsburg State
Pittsburg State Gorillas football seasons
NAIA Football National Champions
NCAA Small College Football Champions
College football undefeated seasons
Pittsburg State Gorillas football